The Vice Chair of the Democratic Caucus is the third-ranking position in the United States Senate Democratic Caucus, created for Senator Chuck Schumer of New York in November 2006 after an exceptionally successful tenure as Chairman of the Democratic Senatorial Campaign Committee. The Vice Chair is a member of the Democratic party leadership of the United States Senate, and is charged with "overseeing Democratic strategy and policy, and keeping and building support for Democratic values".

References

Democratic Party (United States)